Christel Ferrier-Bruneau (born 8 July 1979) is a French racing cyclist. She competed in the women's road race at the 2008 Summer Olympics and the 2013 UCI women's road race in Florence.

References

External links
 

1979 births
Living people
French female cyclists
Sportspeople from Béziers
Olympic cyclists of France
Cyclists at the 2008 Summer Olympics
Cyclists from Occitania (administrative region)
20th-century French women
21st-century French women